The Boulder River is home to 3 waterfalls, one just below its headwaters and the other 2 closer to its mouth.  Below are descriptions of all 3:

Craig Lakes Falls 

The falls are a single horsetail of 400 feet and stay consistent in volume all year. Reaching the falls requires a 2-day round trip trek through the Boulder River Wilderness meaning that most are discouraged from going to the falls due to its extremely difficult access.

Boulder Falls 

The reason for that is that Boulder Falls can only be heard from the Boulder River Trail but not seen. Boulder Falls is also marked on most maps, while Feature Show Falls is not. Feature Show Falls is easily seen from trail, so when people get to Feature Show Falls, they assume its Boulder Falls. One has to go off trail to reach Boulder Falls.

Boulder Falls is aptly named because it simply occurs where the river drops about 40 feet through a large boulder garden.

Half Mile Falls 

It occurs about ¼ of the way between Boulder Falls and the river's mouth. It is about 35 feet tall and is very difficult to reach without a GPS. The falls dump into a large pool.

See also

Boulder River Wilderness

References 

Waterfalls of Snohomish County, Washington
Waterfalls of Washington (state)